Gayton Windmill may refer to a number of windmills in the United Kingdom.

Gayton Windmill, a post mill which stood at 
Gayton Windmill, a tower mill which stands at 
Gayton Windmill , a tower mill in present-day Merseyside

See also  
Gayton (disambiguation)